Krohme (born Chris Moore) is an American hip hop and metal producer, noted for his work with Chuck D, MC Serch, Sid Wilson of Slipknot, Otep, Obie Trice, Brother Ali, Hell Razah, Lord Jamar & Sadat X of Brand Nubian, Sean Price, Doug Wimbish of Living Colour, Cappadonna of the Wu-Tang Clan and more. His music has been featured on MTV, BET and HBO.

Biography
A native of Alexandria, VA,  Krohme (often incorrectly listed as "Khrome") was born in 1980 to an African-American father and a mother of Spanish and German descent. He developed an ear for production via the eclectic music tastes of his parents and later through playing instruments in elementary school. Using his own diverse musical interests, which included hip-hop, soul, rock, heavy metal, and classical, he began sampling records in 1997 to create hip-hop beats that he gave to unsigned artists in the Washington metropolitan area.

It wasn't until 2005 that Krohme connected with his first major artist, Ras Kass, for the single, "The Long Walk Home."

He made his first record label debut on Day by Day Entertainment with MF Grimm's American Hunger album where he produced 3 songs. MF Grimm also served as his manager during this time.

In 2007, Hell Razah of Black Market Militia/Sunz of Man asked Krohme to produce tracks for his solo album, Renaissance Child for Nature Sounds, Nativity with Killah Priest and Lost Ark. He also worked on unreleased remixes for Los Pepes, Pt. 1 and Project Jazz.

Additionally, Krohme founded Godsendant Music (now Godsendant Collective) in February 2005  and released the his first project, All Praises Due, with guest appearances from Royce da 5'9", MC Serch, Agallah, C-Rayz Walz, Hell-Razah, Chace Infinite, Triple Seis and more. The label also featured releases from Block McCloud, Jazz Spastiks, Little Indian, and more before shutting down in 2011.

In between projects, he signed with Babygrande on Valentine's Day 2008 to release his 3-year project, The Beasts Released Volume 1: South of Heaven, which featured Kool G Rap, Sean Price, Chino XL, Agallah, C-Rayz Walz, Hell Razah, Psycho Les, Atari Blitzkrieg, Lord Jamar, Rapper Pooh, Cappadonna, Killah Priest and additional artists which was leaked but never officially released.

He started working on a collaboration album with Hell-Razah in 2009 under the tentative title "Krohme Razahs." In 2006, he produced the Ras Kass track "Hush Little Baby," the infamous diss towards Game and would later work with Game on the remix to the Dezert Eez track, Gunz Out.

After stepping away from music in 2012, Krohme returned in 2020 to produce an album with Breez Evahflowin; Old Man Spring: Krohme. He has since signed deals with Man Bites Dog Records and SpitSLAM Records to begin work on new albums.

Krohme was a member of the Wu-Tang affiliated groups, Lost Children of Babylon and Thug Angelz.

He is also noted for his work as a multi-genre producer and remixer, working with members of Slipknot, Fear Factory, Living Colour, Earth Crisis, My Life with the Thrill Kill Kult and Damnation A.D. to name a few.

Partial Discography

Albums
Breez Evahflowin - Old Man Spring: Krohme (2020)
Shogun Assason - Target Practice 3: Krohme Remixes (2020)
Godforbid of That Handsome Devil x Krohme - Tales of the Haunted Microphone (2021)
Krohme - The Ceremony of Innocence (2022)

EPs
Kahlee x Krohme - Blind to the Facts (2021)
Empuls x Krohme - By Love or By Force (2022)
Krohme - Cursed Earth (2022)
Indigo Phoenyx x Krohme - The Dynasty of Dominique Devereaux (2022)
Empuls x Krohme - By Love or By Force (2022)
I9on x Krohme - Liqwit Krohme (2022)
Paavo x Krohme - Evidence of a Struggle (2022)

Partial list of productions
Almighty - "Soul Position" feat. Bronze Nazareth, M-80, Philie, Son One, 5-Star, Kevlaar 7 & C-Rayz Walz
Canibus - "Gold & Bronze Magik" feat. Bronze Nazareth & Copywrite
Chuck D Featuring the Impossebulls – "Circle of Lies Remix"
Dezert Eez - Mind Stormin feat. Killah Priest
Hell Razah – "Lost Ark"
Hell Razah – "Renaissance Child"
Hell Razah – "Nativity"
Ill Bill ft. Killah Priest - "Awaiting the Hour"
King Dude & Krohme - 16 Tons feat. Doug Wimbish & Daniel Fleming of Age of Ruin
Krohme - Catch Me On Broadway Feat. Shyheim & Dom Pachino
Krohme - Comrades Feat. Cappadonna, Trife Diesel & Ty Farris
Krohme - "Goon Opera (Come See Me)" feat. Kool G Rap, Chino XL, Sean Price, C-Rayz Walz & Hell Razah
Krohme – "Line of Fire" feat. Brother Ali, Chuck D, Speech of Arrested Development, and Doug Wimbish of Living Colour
Krohme – "Ride or Die feat. Challace & Metta World Peace"
Krohme - "Think Twice" feat. Rapper Pooh, Motion Man & Breez Evahflowin
Krohme – "The Judgment" feat. Lord Jamar, Sadat-X and Doug Wimbish
MF Grimm – "Karma" feat. Block McCloud and Ill Bill
MF Grimm – "Page Six"
MF Grimm – "When Faith is Lost"
Obie Trice – "Hope"
Ras Kass – "Hush Little Baby (The Game Diss)"
Ras Kass – "The Long Walk Home" featuring Jay 211
Sid Wilson - "The Love Inside"
Strong Arm Steady – "Set Me Free"

References

External links
Godsendant Music

1980 births
American hip hop record producers
Living people
Musicians from Alexandria, Virginia
Record producers from Virginia
21st-century American rappers